Joy de V. is a 2013 New York noir dramatic thriller film directed and written by Nadia Szold. It won a Special Jury Mention at the 2013 Slamdance Film Festival. The film starred Evan Louison, Josephine de La Baume, Iva Gocheva, and Claudia Cardinale.

Plot
A young con artist, playing the system and collecting checks for a mental disability, is planning a public show to prove his madness when threatened with losing his disability checks. Before he is able to stage his rant, his pregnant girl friend disappears and he must search the city for her.

Cast
Evan Louison as Roman  
Joséphine de La Baume as Joy
Lady Rizo as False Joy
 Iva Gocheva as Marina
Claudia Cardinale as Signora Morosini
Rocco Sisto as Antoine
 Victoria Imperioli as Laszla
 Salvatore Ciccero as Ciro
 Chloé Cunha as Police Officer 
Patricia Black as Patricia
 Nina Eristavi as Julie (voice)
 Reilly Hadden as Jude
 Maïa Ibar as Amelia
 Vadim Imperioli as Daniel
 Katharina Kowalewski as Ava
 Kristina Lieberson as Esme
 Lizzie Lieberson as Cameron
 Jacqueline Loss as Jackie

References

External links

Official site

2013 films
American thriller drama films
2013 thriller drama films
2013 drama films
2010s English-language films
2010s American films